Charles E. Slayback (1840-1924) was a grain merchant in New Orleans, Louisiana, and St. Louis, Missouri. He was a founder of St. Louis's Veiled Prophet Organization.

Early life 
Slayback was born on March 27, 1840, in Marion County, Missouri, the second child of Alexander L. Slayback of Ohio, a lawyer, and Anna Slayback. In 1847, the family moved from Shelbyville, Missouri, to Lexington, Missouri, where the father died in 1848 at age 31. He had two brothers, Alonzo and Preston, and a sister. 

Slayback left home at age 16 and found employment in a St. Louis commission house with a salary of $25 a month, which was raised to $30 at the end of his first year. He left for another company, where he was made a partner at age 22.

Career 
The brothers Charles and Preston both registered on the same day for the draft during the American Civil War, but neither served, their places being taken by substitutes.

In 1869, Slayback was elected organizing president of a social and merchandising club, and in 1870, he was secretary of a committee of the "leading citizens under the style of an 'Electoral Jury of Fifty'" which was charged with advising Louisiana Governor Henry C. Warmoth on the postwar organization of the city of New Orleans. He was elected in that city to the board of directors of the Merchants' Bank in January 1870. 

By 1873, he had his own business in New Orleans and was vice president of the Chamber of Commerce and a director in banks and insurance companies. 

He and his family moved from New Orleans to St. Louis over the winter of 1874–75. "He immediately became a factor in the civic life of the city and was famous for his gift of repartee, which made him a welcome guest at social functions, no matter what their nature," the St. Louis Globe-Democrat newspaper wrote upon his death. Slayback became a prosperous grain broker.

In 1878, Slayback helped establish the Veiled Prophet Society, a club for St. Louis' business elite.      He "called a meeting of local business and civic leaders. His intention was to form a secret society that would blend the pomp and ritual of a New Orleans Mardi Gras with the symbolism used by the Irish poet Thomas Moore. From Moore’s poetry, Slayback and the St. Louis elite created the myth of the Veiled Prophet of Khorassan, a mystic traveller who inexplicably decided to make St. Louis his base of operations," wrote Scott Beauchamp in The Atlantic, citing historian Thomas Spencer, who said the organization was intended to help enforce racial and class order in the city.  

In January 1882, when Slayback was a principal in Slayback, Smythe & Co., he was elected president of the St. Louis Merchants Exchange. 

For several years, he was chancellor of the American Legion of Honor in St. Louis.

He moved to Chicago, Illinois, after 1883 to live with his daughter, Bertha S. Carel. He died there on September 29, 1924. He is buried in Lexington, Missouri.

References

1840 births
1924 deaths